Katalin Boros (born 8 January 1941) is a Hungarian former swimmer. She competed in two events at the 1960 Summer Olympics.

References

1941 births
Living people
Hungarian female swimmers
Olympic swimmers of Hungary
Swimmers at the 1960 Summer Olympics
Swimmers from Budapest